Jeffrey Jeturian (born November 4, 1959) is a Filipino director and production designer for both television and film. Jeturian won the Gawad Urian Best Director Award in 2007 for the film Kubrador. He studied Broadcasting Communication at the University of the Philippines Diliman.

Filmography

Film

Television

As director

As production designer

References

1959 births
Living people
Filipino film directors
University of the Philippines alumni